Petar Pop-Arsov originally spelled in older Bulgarian orthography: Петъръ попъ Арсовъ; (14 August 1868 – 1 January 1941) was a Bulgarian educator  and revolutionary from Ottoman Macedonia, one of the founders of the Internal Macedonian Adrianople Revolutionary Organization (IMARO), known in its early times as Bulgarian Macedonian-Adrianople Revolutionary Committees (BMARC). Although he was Bulgarian teacher and revolutionary, and thought of his compatriots as Bulgarians, according to the post-WWII Macedonian historiography,  he was an ethnic Macedonian.

Early life

He was born in 1868 in the village of Bogomila, near Veles. He was one of the leaders of the student protest in the Bulgarian Men's High School of Thessaloniki in 1887/1888 where the main objective was to replace the East Bulgarian dialect with a Macedonian dialect in the lecturing. As a consequence, he was expelled along with 38 other students. He managed to enroll in the philology studies program at Belgrade University in 1888, but because his resistance to Serbianisation, he was once more evicted in 1890. In 1892 he graduated in Slavistics from Sofia University.

Young Macedonian Literary Society

In 1891 he is one of the founders of Young Macedonian Literary Society in Sofia and its magazine Loza (The Vine). The purpose of the society was twofold: the official one was primarily scholarly and literary. One of the purposes of the magazine of Young Macedonian Literary Society was to defend the idea the dialects from Macedonia to be more represented in Bulgarian literature language.  The articles where historical, cultural and ethnographic. The authors of this magazine clearly considered them as Macedonian Bulgarians, but the Bulgarian government suspected them of the lack of loyalty and some separatism and the magazine was promptly banned by the Bulgarian authorities after several issues.

IMARO

The best proof of the aims and tasks of the Young Macedonian Literary Society was provided during the following year when its members became either founders of or active participants in "The Committee for Obtaining the Political Rights Given to Macedonia by the Congress of Berlin" from which, as Petar Poparsov says, there later developed IMARO. These were the Macedonian intellectuals who were "the witnesses to the hellish condition of Macedonia and took account of the geographical, ethnographic, economic and other characteristics of the country". In 1894 Petŭr Poparsov was asked by the founders to prepare a draft for the first statute of the IMARO, based on the Statute of Vasil Levski's Internal Revolutionary Organization, which was available to them in Zahari Stoyanov's Notes on the Bulgarian Uprisings. Some Macedonian and Bulgarian researchers assume, that in this first statute the organization was called Bulgarian Macedonian-Adrianople Revolutionary Committees, and Poparsov was its author.

From 1896 to 1897 he worked in Štip as a Bulgarian teacher and president of the regional IMARO section. In 1897 he was arrested by Ottoman authorities on charges of inciting rebellion, and sentenced to 101 years in prison. He was pardoned in August 1902. After his release he encountered a changed political climate in Macedonia. He remained passive during the Ilinden-Preobrazhenie Uprising of 1903. However, after the failure of the uprising, he was admitted to the Central Committee of IMARO. At the Rila Congress in November 1905, he was elected in the representative body of IMARO. He championed the idea of Macedonian autonomy. After the Young Turk revolution of 1908, he took an active part in the preparation and holding of the elections for the Ottoman Parliament with the list of the People's Federative Party (Bulgarian Section) but did not receive the necessary number of votes for a deputy.

During the First Balkan War he participated in an unsuccessful meeting attended by some local revolutionaries from the left wing of the IMARO in Veles. It was organized by Dimitrija Čupovski and its aim was to authorize representatives to participate in the London peace conference. They had to try to preserve the integrity of the region of Macedonia.

In Bulgaria

After the Balkan Wars he moved to Bulgaria. Here he married Hrisanta Nasteva, a former teacher of Bulgarian Girls' High School of Thessaloniki. They settled in Kostenets in 1914, where he continuous taught from 1914 to 1929. He worked not only as a teacher but also a director to his retirement. His brother Andrey Poparsov was Mayor of Bogomila during the Bulgarian rule in the area in the First World War, but was killed in October 1918 by the Serbian authorities. In 1920, he protested against the Serbianization of Macedonian Bulgarians implemented in the Kingdom of Serbs, Croats and Slovenes and described its early stages in Macedonia as one of the most powerful factors to the creation of the IMRO. He died after a brief illness in Sofia in 1941.

Books 

Стамболовщината въ Македония и нейнитѣ прѣдставители - Петъръ Попъ Арсовъ

Notes

External links 
 A request made by Peter Poparsov's mother to Bulgarian authorities to assist the release of her son from Ottoman prison

1868 births
1941 deaths
Members of the Internal Macedonian Revolutionary Organization
Bulgarian revolutionaries
Prisoners and detainees of the Ottoman Empire
Recipients of Ottoman royal pardons
Bulgarian people imprisoned abroad
Bulgarian educators
Macedonian Bulgarians
Bulgarian Men's High School of Thessaloniki alumni